Irène Monesi is a French writer. She won the 1966 Prix Femina.

Her novels concerned the problems of lesbian relationships.

Works 
1957: Althia: roman, Éditions du Seuil
1960; Cet acte tendre: roman, Corréa
1963:  Les Bandrilles, Buchet/Chastel, P. Owen
1963:  Les Pères insolites, Buchet/Chaste
1964: Le Faux-fuyant : roman, Buchet-Chastel
1966:  Nature morte devant la fenêtre, Mercure de France, Prix Femina
1968: Une Tragédie superflue, roman., Paris: Mercure de France
1971: Un peuple de colombes, Mercure de France
1972: Vie d'une bête; récit. Mercure de France
1974: L'Amour et le Dédain Mercure de France
1977: Les Mers profondes  Mercure de France
1981:  La Voie lactée Gallimard
1985: Le Parcours du brigadier Sonloup Gallimard

References

External links 
 Nature morte devant la fenêtre (1966) on Sens Critique

Prix Femina winners
20th-century French novelists
20th-century French women writers